Neonectria faginata is a species of fungi that affects Beech trees in North America.  Neonectria faginata, along with Neonectria ditissima, are the cause of beech bark disease in trees that have already been affected by beech scale Cryptococcus fagisuga.

References

Nectriaceae